Benjamin Marc Balthason Ramaroson (born 1955 in Manakara) is a Malagasy clergyman and prelate for the Roman Catholic Diocese of Farafangana, and later Antsiranana. He was appointed bishop in 2005. He moved dioceses in 2013.

See also
Catholic Church in Madagascar

References

1955 births
Malagasy Roman Catholic bishops
Living people
Date of birth missing (living people)